The Chapel of the Sacred Heart was a Roman Catholic parish church under the authority of the Roman Catholic Archdiocese of New York, located in Barrytown, Dutchess County, New York City. It was established in 1886 as a parish; formerly a mission of St. Joseph in Rhinecliff.  It was suppressed as a parish ca. 1975.

History
The Sacred Heart Church and Cemetery were established in the late 1800s to accommodate the Irish Catholic population 
who were employed on the railroads and large estates in Barrytown and the surrounding hamlets. Prior to a Catholic church
in Barrytown, the residents of the area attended services across the river in Kingston and Saugerties. People would walk
across the frozen river in winter or cross by boat in other seasons, weather permitting. Walter V. Miller in "A Parish History"
tells of an old tale: "The account has it that, on one occasion, a boat and its occupants thereof narrowly missed playing the
leading role in a very tragic incident, this happening, strange as it may seem, played a very large part in establishing of the 
first church at Barrytown instead of Red Hook." Apparently, some members of the Donaldson family of Edgewater were on that boat. The Donaldson family donated the land for the church and cemetery at Barrytown.

The cornerstone of the church was laid by Rev. Thomas S. Preston on October 17, 1875. Barrytown was a mission attended from St. Joseph's in Rhinecliff, by pastor James Fitzsimmons, until 1886 when Archbishop Corrigan appointed Rev. William J. McClure resident rector.  The first burial in the Cemetery was November 23, 1886. The rectory was built in 1887. St. Christopher's in Red Hook began as a mission station of Sacred Heart Parish.

Pastors
Father William J. McClure, 1886-1893
Father Daniel J. Cronin, 1893-1899
Father Hugh P. Cullum, 1899-1901
Father Matthew J.F. Scanlon, 1901-1919
Father Joseph B. Cherry, 1919-1922
Father P. McAleer, 1922-1923
Father Cornelius Fitzsimmons, 1924-1932

References 

Religious organizations established in 1886
Religious organizations disestablished in 1975
Roman Catholic churches in New York (state)
Churches in Dutchess County, New York
Closed churches in the Roman Catholic Archdiocese of New York
Roman Catholic chapels in the United States